The Arabian Gulf rugby union team was a combined team of players that represented the countries of the Gulf Cooperation Council in international rugby union competitions. The team competed in international matches between 1993 and 2010, and was governed by the Arabian Gulf Rugby Football Union (AGRFU). Associate members were Egypt, Lebanon and Jordan.

The Arabian Gulf participated in the highest tier of the inaugural 2008 Asian Five Nations alongside Korea, Japan, Hong Kong and Kazakhstan. After losing all four of their matches and subsequently finishing last, the team was relegated to Division One for the 2009 tournament. The team proceeded to win Division One in 2009, securing promotion to the Asian Five Nations for 2010.

However, on 16 January 2009, the sport's international governing body, the International Rugby Board (IRB), announced that the AGRFU – and the combined Arabian Gulf team – would be split into separate national entities and cease to exist by the end of 2010. The first new union to be formed was that of the UAE, which became a full IRB member in November 2012.

The team's final tournament before the breakup was the 2010 Asian Five Nations, which doubled as the final stage of Asian qualification for the 2011 Rugby World Cup. The Arabian Gulf team won two of their four matches, including a 21–19 win in their final match in history at The Sevens in Dubai against Korea.

World Cup record
 1987 - Not invited
 1991 - Did not qualify.
 1995 - Did not qualify.
 1999 - Did not qualify.
 2003 - Did not qualify.
 2007 - Did not qualify. (See 2007 Rugby World Cup – Asia qualification)
 2011 - Did not qualify. (See 2011 Rugby World Cup – Asia qualification)

The team did not take part in the 2015 tournament qualifying as it had been broken up by then.

Women's rugby
Although Arabian Gulf's women never played test match rugby, they were at the time one of the most active international sevens rugby teams, taking part in the first ever women's tournament in 1997, playing over 70 internationals between 1997 and 2010.

Successor teams
Former associate members of the AGRFU, Jordan and Lebanon played each other on 14 May 2010, the first match for both national teams.

The UAE Rugby Federation, and the respective federations of Lebanon, Jordan, Qatar and Saudi Arabia, all subsequently joined Asia Rugby in their own right.

See also
 Rugby union in the Arabian Peninsula
 Arabian Gulf Cup
 Arabian Gulf Futsal Cup
 GCC Games
 Gulf Cooperation Council Athletics Championships
 Gulf Cooperation Council Youth Athletics Championships

References

Gulf Cooperation Council
Asian national rugby union teams
Multinational rugby union teams
Rugby union in the Arabian Peninsula